Luca Castellini, O.P. or Lucas Castellini (died 1631) was a Roman Catholic prelate who served as Bishop of Catanzaro (1629–1631).

Biography
Luca Castellini was ordained a priest in the Order of Preachers. A competent theologian, he was elected Procurator of the Dominican Order, and then, in 1611, Vicar General.

On 19 November 1629, he was appointed by Pope Urban VIII as Bishop of Catanzaro. On 25 November 1629, he was consecrated bishop by Antonio Marcello Barberini, Cardinal-Priest of Sant'Onofrio.

He served as Bishop of Catanzaro for only fourteen months, until his death in 1631.

While bishop he was the principal co-consecrator of Marcantonio Bragadin (cardinal), Bishop of Crema (1629).

He was the author of De electione et confirmatione canonica praelatorum, and De canonizatione sanctorum: Tractatus de miraculis.

References

External links and additional sources

17th-century Italian Roman Catholic bishops
Bishops appointed by Pope Urban VIII
1631 deaths
Dominican bishops